Matthaeus Silvaticus or Mattheus Sylvaticus (c. 1280 – c. 1342) was a medieval Latin medical writer and botanist.

His Life and Encyclopedia
Matthaeus Silvaticus was born in northern Italy, probably Mantua. He was a student and teacher in botany and medicine at the School of Salerno in southern Italy.

His only notability is for writing a 650-page encyclopedia about medicating agents (a pharmacopoeia) which he completed about year 1317 under the Latin title Pandectarum Medicinae or Pandectae Medicinae (English: Encyclopedia of Medicines). Most of the medicating agents were botanicals ("herbal medicines"). The presentation is in alphabetical order. The bulk of his encyclopedia is compiled from earlier medicine books, including books by Dioscorides, Avicenna, Serapion the Younger, and Simon of Genoa.

As an indication of its popularity in late medieval Europe, the Pandectarum Medicinae was printed in at least eleven editions in various countries between the invention of the printing press and 1500.

Arabic influence
The medical school in Salerno was influenced by Arabic-to-Latin translations of Arabic medical literature. One indication of the Arabic influence is that 233 out of 487 plant names in Matthaeus's medicines encyclopedia were Latinizations of Arabic plant names. Many of those Latinized Arabic names had little circulation in Latin. Native Latin names existed for some of them, in which case Matthaeus also used the native Latin name as well. In some cases he prefers to give primary status to the Arabic name in preference to the classical Latin name. In other cases he gives primary status to the Latin name and just mentions what the Arabic name is.

Sources compiled from
The Pandectarum Medicinae is an encyclopedia with almost no original thinking. It has value to historians as a document reflecting the state of pharmacology and medicine in Europe in the late medieval era. The method of presentation in Pandectarum Medicinae is that a medicinal substance is named with brief identifying information and then follows several lengthier summaries or quotations from well-known medical authorities about the substance's properties and uses. The medical authorities are either (A) the particular ancient Greek medicines writers that were widely read by the medieval Arabs (especially Dioscorides and Galen) or else (B) the Arabic medicines writers available in Latin translations (especially Serapion the Younger and Avicenna).

Simon of Genoa
Part of Matthaeus's encyclopedia was taken from a shorter work by Simon of Genoa (aka Simon Januensis) entitled Synonyma Medicinae, which was written a few decades earlier and which is a dictionary of medicines rather than an encyclopedia of medicines.

References

External links
A short biography of Mattheus Silvaticus together with a description of his Pandectarum Medicinae is at SummaGallicana.it (in Italian language)
Different editions of the Opus Pandectarum (aka Liber Pandectae) as printed in Latin in the late 15th century are online at Digitale-Sammlungen.de (year 1498), Digitale-Sammlungen.de (year 1488), Gallica.BNF.fr (year 1480).

14th-century Latin writers
History of medieval medicine
Pharmacopoeias
Year of birth uncertain
1280 births
1342 deaths